Karula Pikkjärv is a lake in Otepää Parish, Valga County, Estonia.

See also
List of lakes of Estonia

References

Otepää Parish
Lakes of Valga County